Suleiman Waithuweka Kangangi (9 December 1988 – 27 August 2022) was a Kenyan cyclist who rode for UCI Continental team . He was killed in a high speed crash while riding in a gravel race in Vermont.

Major results
2016
 8th Overall Tour Ethiopian Meles Zenawi
 9th Overall Tour de Ijen
 10th Overall Tour of Rwanda
2017
 3rd Overall Tour of Rwanda
 8th Overall Tour du Cameroun
 9th Overall Tour Ethiopian Meles Zenawi
2019
 8th Overall Tour du Rwanda

References

External links

1988 births
2022 deaths
Kenyan male cyclists
People from Uasin Gishu County
Cyclists at the 2014 Commonwealth Games
Cyclists at the 2018 Commonwealth Games
Commonwealth Games competitors for Kenya